The 2019 Four Continents Figure Skating Championships were held on February 7–10, 2019 in Anaheim, California, United States. Held annually since 1999, the competition featured skaters from the Americas, Asia, Africa, and Oceania. Medals were awarded in men's singles, ladies' singles, pair skating, and ice dancing.

Qualification 
This competition is open to skaters from all non-European member nations of the International Skating Union. The corresponding competition for European skaters is the 2019 European Figure Skating Championships.

Skaters are eligible for the event if they reached the age of 15 before July 1, 2018. Each national federation is permitted three entries for each discipline and may choose skaters based on their own criteria, as long as the selected skaters have attained the minimum technical elements scores (TES) in accordance with ISU regulations.

Minimum technical element scores (TES) 
The ISU stipulates that the minimum scores must be achieved at an ISU-recognized senior international competition in the ongoing or preceding season, no later than 21 days before the first official practice day. Due to the difference in the rules for the  2017–18 and  2018–19 seasons, the required minimum scores to enter the 2019 Four Continents Championships have been adjusted separately for scores reached in the 2017–18 and the 2018–19 season.

Entries 
The International Skating Union announced the preliminary entries on January 17, 2019.

Changes to preliminary assignments

Records

The following new ISU best scores were set during this competition:

Results

Men

Ladies

Pairs

Ice dancing

Medals summary

Medalists
Medals awarded to the skaters who achieve the highest overall placements in each discipline:

Small medals awarded to the skaters who achieve the highest short program or rhythm dance placements in each discipline:

Small medals awarded to the skaters who achieve the highest free skating or free dance placements in each discipline:

Medals by country
Table of medals for overall placement:

Table of small medals for placement in the short segment:

Table of small medals for placement in the free segment:

Prize money
Prize money is awarded to skaters who achieve a Top 6 placement in each discipline as follows:

References

External links
 
 2019 Four Continents at the International Skating Union

Four Continents Figure Skating Championships